The 2019 UAE Tour was a road cycling stage race, that took place between 24 February and 2 March 2019 in the United Arab Emirates. It was the first edition of the UAE Tour and the third race of the 2019 UCI World Tour.

Teams
Twenty teams started the race. Each team had a maximum of seven riders:

Route

Stages

Stage 1

Stage 2

Stage 3

Stage 4

Stage 5

Stage 6

Stage 7

Classification leadership table

Classifications

References

External links
 Official website

2019
2019 UCI World Tour
2019 in Emirati sport
February 2019 sports events in Asia
March 2019 sports events in Asia